Valerie Wailin Hu is a professor of biochemistry and molecular biology at George Washington University, where she studies autism biomarkers.

Education
Hu has a bachelor's degree from the University of Hawaiʻi (1972) and a PhD from Caltech (1977); she conducted postdoctoral research into membrane biochemistry and immunology at the University of California, Los Angeles.

Research
In her research, she classified autistic children into subgroups based on their Autism Diagnostic Interview-Revised scores, and, as a result, found single nucleotide polymorphisms which, she says, could allow autism to be diagnosed with over 98% accuracy. Specifically, Hu's research has demonstrated that levels of two proteins produced by genes which showed changes in DNA methylation were reduced in the brains of autistic children relative to controls. Based on this finding, Hu has proposed that the use of drugs which block the chemical tagging of these genes may be a useful treatment for autism. An additional topic of Hu's research has been her discovery that the gene RORA that may be under positive regulation by androgens, leading to a buildup of additional testosterone which may contribute to the male bias of autism.

References

Year of birth missing (living people)
Living people
American women biochemists
American geneticists
American molecular biologists
Autism researchers
California Institute of Technology alumni
George Washington University faculty
American people of Chinese descent
University of Hawaiʻi alumni
American women biologists
American women chemists
American women geneticists